The 1971 BC Lions finished in fourth place in the Western Conference, with a 6–9–1 record, and failed to make the playoffs. 

On January 1, Eagle Keys was hired as head coach after coaching Saskatchewan to four consecutive 12+ win seasons, including a 14–2 record in 1970.   However, the Lions did not have the talent that the Roughriders had accumulated, and the Lions had a second consecutive 6-win season.
	
Jim Evenson had another outstanding season and finally won the CFL rushing title, with 1247 yards rushing, and was the lone Lion on the CFL all-star team.
 	
During the season rookie Don Moorhead gradually won the starting quarterback job due to injuries and performance issues with incumbent 3-year starter Paul Brothers (who was traded to Ottawa late in the season) and backup Tom Wilkinson.

Carl Weathers, who later became better known as an actor, joined the team as a linebacker and was on the Lions roster until 1973.
 
For the season, the Lions helmet had a special logo celebrating British Columbia's centennial. The Canadian Confederacy Centennial logo has three orange Cs linked with a small white Pacific dogwood flower at the centre.

Offseason

CFL Draft

Roster

Preseason

Regular season

Season standings

Season schedule

Offensive leaders

Awards and records

1971 CFL All-Stars
RB – Jim Evenson, CFL All-Star

References

BC Lions seasons
1971 Canadian Football League season by team
1971 in British Columbia